Trout River Brewing is a brewery that was originally located in Lyndonville, Vermont, US.  It began production in July 1996, and closed in November 2014. 

In November 2014, the brewery was moved to Springfield, Vermont by its current owners. Beer distribution started again in April 2016.

References

Further reading
 Martin, Claire (January 18, 2014). "Craft Beer, the (Very) Limited Edition". The New York Times.

External links
 

Beer brewing companies based in Vermont
Lyndon, Vermont
Buildings and structures in Springfield, Vermont
1996 establishments in Vermont
American companies established in 1996
Food and drink companies established in 1996